Cabra Corral is a small village and rural municipality in Salta Province in northwestern Argentina. It has only 25 inhabitants. Population numbers have decreased since the last census.

References

External links

Populated places in Salta Province